State Highway 200 (SH-200) is an east–west state highway in northern Idaho, United States. It travels along the north side of Lake Pend Oreille and the Clark Fork River between the Sandpoint area and the Montana border, where it continues as Montana Highway 200. The highway is also a national scenic byway that is named the Pend Oreille Scenic Byway.  This state highway is part of a continuous chain of similarly numbered state highways that stretch from Minnesota to Idaho.

Route description
Idaho SH-200 starts at a junction with U.S. Highway 95 in Ponderay, a small community north of Sandpoint. The highway heads eastward along the north shores of lake Pend Oreille at the very feet of the Cabinet Mountains with several turnouts and scenic overlooks. After the town of Clark Fork it then enters the Clark Fork River Valley following the Clark Fork River and ends at the Montana border just before Heron, MT where it becomes Montana Highway 200.

The road passes through the towns of Ponderay, Kootenai, Hope, East Hope, and Clark Fork.

ID-200 is the westernmost portion of a chain of Highway 200s which extends east through Montana, North Dakota, and Minnesota. At only  in length, Idaho's Highway 200 is the shortest in the chain while Montana's Highway 200 is the longest. There is another highway called SR 20 in Washington that would complete the chain of Hwy 200s, but ID-200 is no longer directly connected to WA-20.

History 

SH-200 was originally part of the National Parks Highway, a national auto trail created in the early 20th century to connect various national parks. In the 1930s, it was designated as State Highway 3, corresponding with the Montana highway's number. From 1941 to 1967, the route was signed as part of U.S. Route 10A. After that highway's decommissioning, Idaho State Highway 200 was created in 1968 to replace it as part of a multi-state effort to renumber highways on the Spokane–Duluth corridor to the same number. By 2007, the portion of Highway 200 west of the US 2/95 intersection had been terminated. Mileposts still display its pre-2007 length.

Major intersections

Business route

State Highway 200 Business (SH-200 BUS) is a business route of Highway 200 that runs through Hope, Idaho. It follows the former route of US 10A.

See also

 List of state highways in Idaho
 List of highways numbered 200

References

External links

 Pend Oreille Scenic Byway
  National Scenic Byways Program, Pend Oreille Scenic Byway
 

200
Transportation in Bonner County, Idaho